Florin Georgian Mironcic (born 4 May 1981 in Brăila) is an athlete from Romania sprint canoer who has competed since 2003. He won three medals at the ICF Canoe Sprint World Championships with a silver (C-4 1000 m: 2005) and two bronzes (C-4 500 m: 2006, 2007).

Mironcic also competed in two Summer Olympics, earning his best finish of sixth in the C-1 1000 m event at Beijing in 2008.

Dubbed Uriaşul Blond (Romanian for "The Blond Giant"), he is a member of the Dinamo Bucharest club. Mironcic is 1.92 m (6'4") tall and weighs 95 kg (209 lbs).

References

1981 births
Living people
Canoeists at the 2004 Summer Olympics
Canoeists at the 2008 Summer Olympics
Sportspeople from Brăila
Romanian male canoeists
Olympic canoeists of Romania
ICF Canoe Sprint World Championships medalists in Canadian